Kota Masai is a township in Pasir Gudang, Johor Bahru District, Johor, Malaysia. This township is located between Masai and Pasir Gudang.

Kelab Bolasepak Kota Masai adalah sebuah kelab bolasepak berdaftar yang juga berpengkalan di Kota Masai.

Kebanyakan jalan-jalan di Kota Masai menggunakan nama buah-buahan untuk taman lama dan sebahagian besar telah diambil alih oleh EcoTropics.Kota Masai terletak di bawah PBT Majlis Perbandaran Pasir Gudang(MPPG) dan terdapat 2 parlimen iaitu Parlimen Tebrau dan Parlimen Pasir Gudang.

Pendidikan

Sekolah Kebangsaan
SK Taman Kota Masai
SK Taman Kota Masai 2
SK Taman Kota Masai 3
Sekolah Rendah Jenis Kebangsaan Tamil Pasir Gudang (SJK(T) Pasir Gudang)
Sekolah Rendah Jenis Kebangsaan Cina Ladang Grisek (SJK(C) Ladang Gersik)

Sekolah Menengah
Sekolah Menengah Kebangsaan Kota Masai (SKOMAS)
Sekolah Menengah Kebangsaan Kota Masai 2

Sekolah Agama Johor
 Sekolah Agama Taman Kota Masai

Pasir Gudang
Townships in Johor